Sheker is a village in the Kara-Buura District of Talas Region of Kyrgyzstan. Its population was 4,532 in 2021. It is the birthplace of Chinghiz Aitmatov.

References

Populated places in Talas Region